Whifflet Upper railway station served the village of Whifflet, North Lanarkshire, Scotland from 1886 to 1964 on the Rutherglen and Coatbridge Railway.

History 
The station opened as Whifflet High Level on 1 June 1886 by the Caledonian Railway. To the southeast was Whifflet High Level signal box. The station closed on 1 January 1917 but reopened in March 1919. The station's name was changed to Whifflet Upper on 7 November 1953. It closed on 5 October 1964.

References

External links 

Disused railway stations in North Lanarkshire
Former Caledonian Railway stations
Beeching closures in Scotland
Railway stations in Great Britain opened in 1866
Railway stations in Great Britain closed in 1964
Railway stations in Great Britain opened in 1917
Railway stations in Great Britain closed in 1919
1886 establishments in Scotland
1964 disestablishments in Scotland
Coatbridge